Harlingen is an unincorporated community and census-designated place (CDP) located within Montgomery Township, in Somerset County, New Jersey, United States. As of the 2010 United States Census, the CDP's population was 297.

It is adjacent to the historical areas of Dutchtown and Bridgepoint. Harlingen Road and U.S. Route 206 intersect in the center of Harlingen. The Harlingen Dutch Reformed Church on Route 206 is extant and had an associated cemetery. The town was a stop on the short-lived Mercer and Somerset Railway.

Geography
According to the United States Census Bureau, Harlingen had a total area of 0.717 square mile (1.858 km2), all of which was land.

Demographics

Census 2010

Harlingen Dutch Reformed Church

The Harlingen Dutch Reformed Church is in the Belle Mead, New Jersey section of Montgomery Township. The congregation was organized in 1727, and the minister was one of the major antagonists in the dispute between the traditionalists and the American party that contested governance of the Dutch Reformed Church. The church is still active.

The Reverend Johannes Arondeus, sent by the Classis of Amsterdam, was pastor from 1747 to 1754.

References

Census-designated places in Somerset County, New Jersey
Montgomery Township, New Jersey